High Rise was a noise rock band from Tokyo, Japan formed in 1982. The core of the band has consisted of bassist Asahito Nanjo and guitarist Munehiro Narita. The group named themselves after the 1975 novel High Rise by J. G. Ballard. Their music draws from psychedelic music, free jazz, and improvisational music.

History 
High Rise were originally performing under the name Psychedelic Speed Freaks and contained members Masashi Mitani, Asahito Nanjo, Munehiro Narita, and Ikuro Takahashi. They decided to change their name at the advice of P.S.F. Records, which claimed Psychedelic Speed Freaks sounded "too direct".

Discography 
Studio albums
II (1986, P.S.F.)
Dispersion (1992, P.S.F.)
Disallow (1996, P.S.F.)
Desperado (1998, P.S.F.)

Live albums
Psychedelic Speed Freaks (1984, P.S.F.)
Live (1994, P.S.F.)
Psychobomb -U.S. Tour 2000- (2000, P.S.F.)

Compilation albums
Psychedelic Speed Freaks '84-'85 (1997, Time Bomb)
Destination (2002, P.S.F.)

References

External links 
 
 

Japanese rock music groups
Japanese noise rock groups
Musical groups established in 1982
Musical groups disestablished in 2002
Musical groups from Tokyo
1982 establishments in Japan
P.S.F. Records artists